Maddie Rice is an American guitarist. She performed several years with Jon Batiste's Stay Human, the house band for The Late Show with Stephen Colbert. She currently plays with the Saturday Night Live Band.

Early life and education 

Rice grew up in Salt Lake City, Utah, and attended Judge Memorial Catholic High School.  Rice moved to Boston, Massachusetts for college, where she attended the Berklee College of Music.  She left Berklee after her sophomore year to move to L.A.

Career 
In 2015, at the age of 22, she started playing lead guitar for Stay Human, the house band for The Late Show with Stephen Colbert. Since 2020, she has been part of the Saturday Night Live Band.

Maddie has toured with various artists, 
including Korean pop singer Taeyang,  indie-dance pop band Rubblebucket and electronic dance music artist Big Wild.

References

External links 
 
 
 
 

Living people
1993 births
21st-century American guitarists
21st-century American women guitarists
Musicians from Utah
Berklee College of Music alumni
The Late Show with Stephen Colbert
Saturday Night Live Band members
The Late Show Band members